The Cook Islands competed in three events at the 1996 Summer Olympics in Atlanta, United States.

Athletics

Men

Key
Note–Ranks given for track events are within the athlete's heat only
Q = Qualified for the next round
q = Qualified for the next round as a fastest loser or, in field events, by position without achieving the qualifying target
NR = National record
N/A = Round not applicable for the event
Bye = Athlete not required to compete in round

Sailing

Weightlifting

Men

References

Official Olympic Reports
Cook Island Sports & National Olympic Committee

Nations at the 1996 Summer Olympics
1996
1996 in Cook Islands sport